Boris Ivanyuzhenkov (born 25 February 1966 in Reutov) is a Russian political figure and a deputy of the 8th State Duma.
 
At the age of 15, Ivanyuzhenkov started to engage in Greco-Roman wrestling. He is a Master of sport in Greco-Roman wrestling, multiple winner and winner of international and Russian tournaments. From 1984 to 1986, he served at the Soviet Armed Forces. In 1996, he was elected Vice President of the Russian Wrestling Federation. The same year, he became a member of the Russian Olympic Committee. From 1997 to 1999, he became a deputy of the Moscow Oblast Duma of the 2nd convocation. On 24 June 1999 he left the post to become the Minister of Sport. From 2006 to 2021, he was the Vice President of the Russian Paralympic Committee. He left the post in March 2021 due to the sanctions introduced by the World Anti-Doping Agency that prohibited Russian government officials from holding leadership positions in sports federations. In 2011, he was elected deputy of the 6th State Duma. In 2016, Ivanyuzhenkov participated in the election for the 7th State Duma but was not elected. However, in 2019, he received vacated mandate after the death of Zhores Alferov. In 2021, he was re-elected for the 7th, and 8th State Dumas.
 
According to The Insider, in the 1990s, Ivanyuzhenkov was a member of one of the largest organized crime groups in Russia titled "Podolsk criminal group" and appeared in old crime chronicles as "Rotan". 
 
During his time at the 7th State Duma, he did not say a single word even though, according to the official records, he attended all the meetings.

Awards  
 Order "For Merit to the Fatherland"

References
 

 

1966 births
Living people
Communist Party of the Russian Federation members
21st-century Russian politicians
Eighth convocation members of the State Duma (Russian Federation)
Seventh convocation members of the State Duma (Russian Federation)
Sixth convocation members of the State Duma (Russian Federation)
People from Reutov